In the field of calculus of variations in mathematics, the method of Lagrange multipliers on Banach spaces can be used to solve certain infinite-dimensional constrained optimization problems. The method is a generalization of the classical method of Lagrange multipliers as used to find extrema of a function of finitely many variables.

The Lagrange multiplier theorem for Banach spaces
Let X and Y be real Banach spaces. Let U be an open subset of X and let f : U → R be a continuously differentiable function. Let g : U → Y be another continuously differentiable function, the constraint: the objective is to find the extremal points (maxima or minima) of f subject to the constraint that g is zero.

Suppose that u0 is a constrained extremum of f, i.e. an extremum of f on

Suppose also that the Fréchet derivative Dg(u0) : X → Y of g at u0 is a surjective linear map. Then there exists a Lagrange multiplier λ : Y → R in Y∗, the dual space to Y, such that

Since Df(u0) is an element of the dual space X∗, equation (L) can also be written as

where (Dg(u0))∗(λ) is the pullback of λ by Dg(u0), i.e. the action of the adjoint map (Dg(u0))∗ on λ, as defined by

Connection to the finite-dimensional case
In the case that X and Y are both finite-dimensional (i.e. linearly isomorphic to Rm and Rn for some natural numbers m and n) then writing out equation (L) in matrix form shows that λ is the usual Lagrange multiplier vector; in the case n = 1, λ is the usual Lagrange multiplier, a real number.

Application
In many optimization problems, one seeks to minimize a functional defined on an infinite-dimensional space such as a Banach space.

Consider, for example, the Sobolev space  and the functional  given by

Without any constraint, the minimum value of f would be 0, attained by u0(x) = 0 for all x between −1 and +1. One could also consider the constrained optimization problem, to minimize f among all those u ∈ X such that the mean value of u is +1. In terms of the above theorem, the constraint g would be given by

However this problem can be solved as in the finite dimensional case since the Lagrange multiplier  is only a scalar.

See also
 Pontryagin's minimum principle, Hamiltonian method in calculus of variations

References

  (See Section 4.14, pp.270–271.)

Calculus of variations